Fort Massac (or Fort Massiac) is a French colonial and early National-era fort on the Ohio River in Massac County, Illinois.

Its site was listed on the National Register of Historic Places in 1971.

History
The Spanish explorer Hernando de Soto and his soldiers may have built a fort nearby as early as 1540. Maps from the early 18th century show an "Ancien Fort" ("Old Fort") near this location.

Fort Massac was built by the French in 1757, during the French and Indian War and was originally called "Fort de L’Ascension." The name was changed in 1759, to honor of Claud Louis d'Espinchal, Marquis de Massiac, the French Naval Minister. Massiac is a French town in the Cantal department.

The French left the fort at the conclusion of the war, and it was destroyed by the Chickasaw sometime after 1763. In 1778, during the American Revolutionary War, Colonel George Rogers Clark led his regiment of "Long Knives" into Illinois near the site of the fort at Massac Creek. The fort was rebuilt in 1794, during the Northwest Indian War.

In the fall of 1803, the Lewis and Clark Expedition stopped at Fort Massac on its way west, recruiting two volunteers.

In 1805, General James Wilkinson and Vice President Aaron Burr held discussions at the fort.  It is unclear, what connection this meeting may have had to the unfolding Burr Conspiracy (1806-1807), but as an important river fort in what was then the western United States, the fort was connected to several events related to the conspiracy.

The Fort was repaired after being damaged in the 1811–12 New Madrid earthquakes, but it was decommissioned in 1814.

State park and historic site
The Fort Massac site became the first Illinois state park in 1908. In the 1970s, a partial reconstruction of the 1794 U.S. Army fort was built, but in 2002, it was torn down, and a smaller but more detailed version fort as it appeared in 1802 was reconstructed.

Each fall, reenactors gather for the Fort Massac Encampment, which interprets life in the 18th century. A visitor center just north of the reconstruction includes a museum with Indian artifacts, mannequins in period clothing, and other exhibits that explain the history of the fort.

Notes

References

Further reading
Caldwell, N.W. (1950) "Fort Massac: The American Frontier Post: 1778-1805," Journal of the Illinois State Historical Society. 
Rothert, Otto A. The Outlaws of Cave-In-Rock, Otto A. Rothert, Cleveland 1924; rpt. 1996 
Underwood, Thomas Taylor. Journal, Thomas Taylor Underwood, March 26, 1792, to March 18, 1800: an old soldier in Wayne's Army, Publisher Society of Colonial Wars in the State of Ohio, 1945

External links

Papers of the War Department 1784-1800
Map of "La Louisiane", 1719-1730, Johann Baptiste Homann
National Register of Historic Places, Nomination Form

Massac
Ohio River
1757 establishments in the French colonial empire
Archaeological sites on the National Register of Historic Places in Illinois
Massac
Museums in Massac County, Illinois
History museums in Illinois
Massac
Protected areas established in 1908
State parks of Illinois
Protected areas of Massac County, Illinois
Military and war museums in Illinois
Mssac
National Register of Historic Places in Massac County, Illinois